Popping is a style of street dance.

Popping may also refer to:
 Joint popping, the action of moving joints to produce a sharp cracking or popping sound
 Popping (computer graphics), an unwanted visual effect that occurs when changing the level of detail of a 3D model
 Popping corn, popcorn
 Pre-popping, a method of transferring lead information from one online lead form to another
 Skin popping, a method of drug administration
 Slapping and popping, two different playing techniques used on the double bass and on the (electric) bass guitar

See also 

 Pop (disambiguation)
 Poppin' (disambiguation)
 Robot (dance), a street dance style often confused with popping